Tuhobić may refer to:

 Tuhobić, Bosnia and Herzegovina, a hamlet near Kalinovik, Bosnia
 Tuhobić (mountain), a mountain in Gorski Kotar, Croatia